The US 69 Missouri River Bridge is a girder bridge carrying U.S. Route 69 (US 69) over the Missouri River. It connects Interstate 635 (I-635) in Riverside, Missouri with the 7th Street Trafficway and Fairfax District in Kansas City, Kansas. Construction began in the fall of 2014. The bridge opened to automobile traffic in October 2016 and was formally opened to all traffic on March 16, 2017. In addition to automobiles, the bridge also carries bicycle and pedestrian traffic. It replaced the now-demolished Fairfax and Platte Purchase bridges. The bridge was constructed by the Missouri Department of Transportation at cost of $79 million (equivalent to $ million in ). Construction costs were split with the Kansas Department of Transportation.

See also
 List of crossings of the Missouri River

References

Bridges in Kansas City, Kansas
Buildings and structures in Platte County, Missouri
Transportation in the Kansas City metropolitan area
Bridges over the Missouri River
Bridges completed in 2016
Road bridges in Missouri
Road bridges in Kansas
U.S. Route 69
Bridges of the United States Numbered Highway System
Interstate vehicle bridges in the United States